East Balikpapan is a district in the city of Balikpapan, East Kalimantan, Indonesia. There area of this district is 92.42 km2 in water, and in land an area is 137.158 km2. East Balikpapan is bordered by Kutai Kartanegara Regency to the North, by the Makassar Strait to the South and East, and by North Balikpapan district to the West.

Economics

Tourism
There are contains numerous popular tourist spots, both modern historical & modern. These include Japanese Soldier Tomb Monument, Teritip Crocodile Breeding Zoo and the popular beach like as Manggar Segarasari Beach and Lamaru Beach.

Agricultural
Apart from being known for its coastal area, there is the center for agricultural food in Teritip subdistrict. In agriculture, Papaya is one of the most commonly cultivated fruits and cultivates vegetable horticulture. In addition, there are poultry raising that is sufficient to meet food needs. In the Gunung Binjai area, there are extensive zalacca plantations. Not only agriculture, this district has production, processing and marketing centers for fishery commodities in Manggar and Manggar Baru subdistricts.

Manufactures
Some multinational corporations operate in East Balikpapan district. Companies including Baker Hughes (US), Halliburton (US), Schlumberger (France), Thiess (Australia), Komatsu (Japan), Elnusa (Indonesia) and Weatherford International (US) use Manggar subdistricts as their base of operations in the region, and several others also attract many people to work in this area.

Government
In military, there are contains Depo of Vocational Education Military is a school founded by the Main Regiment of Army Military Command VI/Mulawarman was operated in Manggar Baru subdistrict and Dhomber Airfield (known as the Indonesian Air Force Base in Balikpapan) is a base belonging to the air force located in Manggar subdistrict. Another the public government are office Police Sector in Lamaru subdistrict, and Community Health Centers and Office District in Manggar subdistrict.

Sport
Batakan Stadium is a football stadium in Manggar subdistrict. The stadium hosts Liga 2 club Persiba Balikpapan and its has a capacity of 40,000.

Administrative divisions
East Balikpapan is divided into 4 administrative sub-districts:

Infrastructure

Historical architecture
 Japanese Soldier Tomb Monument (Monumen Makam Tentara Jepang)

Nature and park
 Teritip Crocodile Breeding Zoo (Penangkaran Buaya Teritip)
 Manggar Segarasari Beach (Pantai Manggar Segarasari)
 Lamaru Beach (Pantai Lamaru)
 Batakan Beach (Pantai Batakan)
 Serumpun Beach (Pantai Serumpun)
 Surya Hill Recreational Park (Taman Rekreasi Bukit Surya)
 Mangrove Forest Hall Barnacle Conservation (Hutan Manggrove Pendopo)
 Alpha Hill (Bukit Alpha)
 Lamaru Mirror Lake (Danau Cermin)

Educations
 Public 8 of Junior School (SMP Negeri 8)
 Public 13 of Junior School (SMP Negeri 13)
 Public 19 of Junior School (SMP Negeri 19)
 Public 7 of High School (SMA Negeri 7)
 Public 1 of Madrasah Ibtidayah (MI Negeri 1)
 Public 5 of Vocational High School (SMK Negeri 5)

References

External links
 East Balikpapan official site (in Indonesia)

Balikpapan